This article is about the demographic features of the population of Wallis and Futuna, including population density, ethnicity, education level, health of the populace, economic status, religious affiliations and other aspects of the population.

Vital statistics

Births and deaths

CIA World Factbook demographic statistics 
The following demographic statistics are from the CIA World Factbook, unless otherwise indicated.

Population
15,854

Age structure
0–14 years: 20.58% (male 1,702/female 1,561)
15–24 years: 14.72% (male 1,238/female 1,095)
25–54 years: 43.55% (male 3,529/female 3,376)
55–64 years: 9.92% (male 742/female 830)
65 years and over: 11.23% (male 856/female 925)

Population growth rate
0.28%

Birth rate
12.7 births/1,000 population

Death rate
5.7 deaths/1,000 population

Net migration rate
-4.3 migrant(s)/1,000 population

Infant mortality rate
Total: 4.2 deaths/1,000 live births
Male: 4.4 deaths/1,000 live births
Female: 3.9 deaths/1,000 live births

Life expectancy at birth
Total population: 80.2 years
Male: 77.2 years
Female: 83.4 years (2020 est.)

Total fertility rate
1.71 children born/woman

Nationality
noun: Wallisian(s), Futunan(s), or Wallis and Futuna Islanders
adjective: Wallisian, Futunan, or Wallis and Futuna Islander

Ethnic groups
Polynesian
French

Religions
Roman Catholic 99%
Other 1%

Languages
Wallisian (indigenous Polynesian language): 58.9%
Futunian: 30.1%
French (officials): 10.8%.
Other: 0.2%

See also
Wallis and Futuna

References

Society of Wallis and Futuna